Old Enough to Know Better is the debut studio album by American country music artist Wade Hayes. Released in early 1995 on Columbia Records, it produced a Number One hit on the Billboard Hot Country Singles & Tracks (now Hot Country Songs) charts in its title track. The singles "I'm Still Dancin' with You," "Don't Stop," and "What I Meant to Say" were also Top Ten hits on the same chart. The album itself was certified gold by the RIAA for US shipments of 500,000 copies. The track "Steady as She Goes" was co-written by both members of Brooks & Dunn.

Track listing

Personnel
As listed in liner notes.
Bruce Bouton – slide guitar, pedal steel guitar 
Mark Casstevens – acoustic guitar 
Rob Hajacos – fiddle, "electric hoedown tools"
Wade Hayes – lead vocals, background vocals
Mitch Humphries – piano (5)
John Barlow Jarvis – piano (1-4, 6-10), Hammond organ (5)
Patty Loveless – background vocals (4)
Brent Mason – electric guitar, six-string bass guitar
Michael Rhodes – bass guitar
John Wesley Ryles – background vocals (1-3, 5-10)
Dennis Wilson – background vocals (1-3, 5-10)
Lonnie Wilson – drums, percussion

Charts

Weekly charts

Year-end charts

Certifications

References

Sources
Liner notes to Old Enough to Know Better. Columbia Records, 1995.

1995 debut albums
Columbia Records albums
Wade Hayes albums
Albums produced by Don Cook